In statistics, Yates's correction for continuity (or Yates's chi-squared test) is used in certain situations when testing for independence in a contingency table. It aims
at correcting the error introduced by assuming that the discrete probabilities of frequencies in the table can be approximated by a continuous distribution (chi-squared). In some cases, Yates's correction may adjust too far, and so its current use is limited.

Correction for approximation error
Using the chi-squared distribution to interpret Pearson's chi-squared statistic requires one to assume that the discrete probability of observed binomial frequencies in the table can be approximated by the continuous chi-squared distribution. This assumption is not quite correct, and introduces some error.

To reduce the error in approximation, Frank Yates, an English statistician, suggested a correction for continuity that adjusts the formula for Pearson's chi-squared test by subtracting 0.5 from the difference between each observed value and its expected value in a 2 × 2 contingency table. This reduces the chi-squared value obtained and thus increases its p-value.

The effect of Yates's correction is to prevent overestimation of statistical significance for small data. This formula is chiefly used when at least one cell of the table has an expected count smaller than 5. Unfortunately, Yates's correction may tend to overcorrect. This can result in an overly conservative result that fails to reject the null hypothesis when it should (a type II error). So it is suggested that Yates's correction is unnecessary even with quite low sample sizes, such as:

The following is Yates's corrected version of Pearson's chi-squared statistics:

where:

Oi = an observed frequency
Ei = an expected (theoretical) frequency, asserted by the null hypothesis
N = number of distinct events

2 × 2 table 
As a short-cut, for a 2 × 2 table with the following entries:

we can write N=a+b+c+d

 

In some cases, this is better.

See also 
 Continuity correction
 Wilson score interval with continuity correction

References

Statistical tests for contingency tables